The 1895 San Jose State Spartans football team represented State Teachers College at San Jose during the 1895 college football season.  In their third year of play, the Spartans achieved their first tie, a 6–6 decision against nearby College of the Pacific (this was also the first football game for Pacific).  The contest was played in late January 1896, but as was done in 1892, their game was counted in the 1895 academic year.

Schedule

References

San Jose State
San Jose State Spartans football seasons
College football undefeated seasons
College football winless seasons
San Jose State Spartans football